Kurt Heise (born February 9, 1966) is a Republican politician from Michigan formerly serving in the Michigan House of Representatives.

Prior to his election to the House of Representatives, Heise was the director of the Wayne County Department of Environment and county drain commissioner from 2003 to 2009. He is a municipal attorney and environmental consultant, and a member of the Blue Ribbon Commission on Lake St. Clair.

He is also the primary backer of a bill currently on the House floor (5/20/2015) that would exempt much of the specifics of Michigan's energy infrastructure from inquiries under the Freedom of Information Act. Heise formally announced his candidacy for the Republican nomination for Plymouth Township Supervisor in the 2016 election but was kicked off the ballot due to unfinished paperwork. Despite being kicked off the ballot, Heise won a write-in campaign in the Republican primary election for Plymouth Township Supervisor.

U.S. House of Representatives elections

2018

In 2018 he filed to run to replace two term Representative Dave Trott. However, in February he withdrew from the race and endorsed State Senate Leader Mike Kowall.

References

Living people
1966 births
Republican Party members of the Michigan House of Representatives
Politicians from Dearborn, Michigan
People from Plymouth, Michigan
University of Michigan alumni
Wayne State University Law School alumni